The Deutsch-Arabische Gesellschaft (DAG; The German-Arab Association) is a non-governmental non-profit association founded in 1966 to strengthen German-Arabian relations in political, environmental, and cultural areas.

Organisational structure

Executive committee 
The association is governed by an executive committee headed by a president. Other members of the committee are at least two vice presidents, the treasurer and the secretary general. The dean of the advisory board and the honorary presidents (if any have been appointed) are invited to meetings of the executive committee to offer advise. At the time of writing (2023) the president is Vittoria Alliata di Villafranca. Notable former presidents include Peter Scholl-Latour and Jürgen Möllemann.

Advisory board 
The executive committee is supported by an advisory board consisting of the dean of the advisory board (currently former German ambassador Bernd Erbel), the ambassadors of the Arabic nations to Germany and other members.

External links 
Deutsch-Arabische Gesellschaft

Non-profit organisations based in Berlin
Germany friendship associations
Organizations established in 1966
Arab organizations
Foreign relations of Germany
1966 establishments in Germany